The South magazine is a bi-monthly magazine published in Savannah, Georgia. It was founded in 2005 by Michael Brooks. In 2011, South magazine was presented with eight awards during the 22nd Annual Magazine Association GAMMA Awards.

References 

Magazines established in 2005
Magazines published in Savannah, Georgia
Bimonthly magazines published in the United States
2005 establishments in Georgia (U.S. state)